A.K.A. Abdul Samad  (4 October 1926 – 4 November 1999) was a prominent Tamil politician, and an important leader of the Indian Union Muslim League. He was also a journalist, editor, author, educationist and businessman. He is popularly known in his native states of Tamil Nadu and Kerala by the title "Siraj-ul-Millat" (Light of the Nation).

Association with political parties
 All India General Secretary, Indian Union Muslim League
 State President (Tamil Nadu), Indian Union Muslim League

Political career
 MP, Ninth Lok Sabha, 1989–91 (affiliated with Indian National Congress, serving Vellore, TN)
 MP, Seventh Lok Sabha, 1980–84 (Independent, serving Vellore, TN)
 MLA, Legislative Assembly, Tamil Nadu, 1984–88 (affiliated with Dravida Munnetra Kazhagam serving Triplicane, Chennai) 
 MP, Rajya Sabha, 1964–76

Government experience
 Member, Public Accounts Committee, Tamil Nadu Legislative Assembly, 1985–86
 Member, Public Accounts Committee, Rajya Sabha
 Member, Committee on Absence of Members from the Sittings of the House and Committee on Petitions, 7th Lok Sabha
 Member, Consultative Committee, Ministry of Tourism and Civil Aviation, Rajya Sabha
 Member, Committee on the Welfare of Scheduled Castes and Scheduled Tribes, Rajya Sabha
 Member, Consultative Committee, Ministry of Industry, 1990

Delegation to foreign countries
 Member, IPD to Yugoslavia, 1971
 Member, Govt. of India's Haj Delegation, 1971 and 1989

Memberships
 Syndicate Member, Madras University
 Senate Member, Annamalai University
 Court Member, Aligarh Muslim University
 President, Muslim Educational Association of South India (MEASI)
 Chairman, Board of Islamic Studies, Madras University

Publications
 Sweet Memories of Sacred Haj (Tamil)
 'Narpaniyatri Nabi Mani' (Muhammad's Biography in Tamil)
 'An Introduction to Holy Quran' (Tamil)
 Founder-Editor, Mani Chudar (Tamil Daily)
 Founder-Editor, Mani Vilakkur (Tamil Monthly)
 Publisher, Crescent (English Weekly)

Social activities
 Amelioration of the down-trodden
 Communal harmony
 Spread of higher education amongst Muslim minorities

External links
 https://web.archive.org/web/20120223184105/http://164.100.47.132/LssNew/biodata_1_12/2653.htm
 https://web.archive.org/web/20120626010449/http://www.indianunionmuslimleague.in/
 https://web.archive.org/web/20160304055815/http://parliamentofindia.nic.in/lsdeb/ls12/ses4/01210499.htm

Tamil Nadu politicians
1999 deaths
1926 births
India MPs 1980–1984
India MPs 1989–1991
Lok Sabha members from Tamil Nadu
Rajya Sabha members from Tamil Nadu
People from Karaikal
Indian Union Muslim League politicians from Tamil Nadu
People from Vellore district